Stig Raagaard Hansen (born 29 November 1962) is a Danish sailor. He competed in the Tornado event at the 2000 Summer Olympics.

References

External links
 

1962 births
Living people
Danish male sailors (sport)
Olympic sailors of Denmark
Sailors at the 2000 Summer Olympics – Tornado
Place of birth missing (living people)